National Route 220 is a national highway of Japan connecting Miyazaki, Miyazaki and Kirishima, Kagoshima in Japan, with a total length of 186.1 km (115.64 mi).

References

National highways in Japan
Roads in Kagoshima Prefecture
Roads in Miyazaki Prefecture